Malcolm Stoddard (born 20 July 1948) is a British actor who has appeared in films and television.

Early life
He attended the all-male grammar school Chichester High School For Boys.

Career
His TV credits include The Voyage of Charles Darwin, Colditz, The Brothers, The New Avengers, Jennie: Lady Randolph Churchill (1974), Blake's 7, The Treachery Game, Oxford Blues (1984), Rain on the Roof, The Assassination Run, Squadron, By the Sword Divided, Juliet Bravo, Boon, The Bill, Families, Emmerdale, The Campbells, Heartbeat and Road to Avonlea.

His films include Cari Genitori (1973), Luther (1974), S.O.S. Titanic (1979), The Godsend (1980), Tree of Hands (1989), Innocent Victim (1989), Gulliver's Travels (1996), Treasure Island (1999) and Dil Jo Bhi Kahey... (2005).

Filmography

Film

Television

References

External links
 

1948 births
English male soap opera actors
People from Chichester
Living people